Dolicharthria triflexalis is a moth in the family Crambidae. It was described by Max Gaede in 1916. It is found in Cameroon.

References

Moths described in 1916
Spilomelinae
Moths of Africa